Elonidae is a family of air-breathing land snails, terrestrial pulmonate gastropods mollusks in the superfamily Helicoidea.

This family is within the clade Eupulmonata (according to the taxonomy of the Gastropoda by Bouchet & Rocroi, 2005).

Subfamilies and genera
The family Elonidae consists of two subfamilies (according to the taxonomy of the Gastropoda by Bouchet & Rocroi, 2005):
 Eloninae Gittenberger, 1977
 Klikiinae H. Nordsieck, 1986

Genera
Genera in the family Elonidae include:
 † Cyrtochilus F. Sandberger, 1875 
 † Eurystrophe Gude, 1911 
 †Joossia Pfeffer, 1930 
 † Lychnopsis Vidal, 1917 
 † Megalocochlea Wenz, 1919 
 † Papillotopsis H. Binder, 2017 
 † Puisseguria Schlickum, 1975 
Eloninae
 The type genus is Elona H. Adams & A. Adams, 1855. It is a monotypic genus, with only one species: Elona quimperiana
 † Galactochiloides Wenz, 1919 
 Norelona Nordsieck, 1986
 Norelona pyrenaica (Draparnaud, 1805)
 † Tropidomphalus Pilsbry, 1895 
Klikiinae
 † Apula C. R. Boettger, 1909 
 † Klikia Pilsbry, 1895
 † Pseudochloritis C. R. Boettger, 1909 

Synonyms
 Sterna Albers, 1850: synonym of Elona H. Adams & A. Adams, 1855 ((Invalid: junior homonym of Sterna Linnaeus, 1758 [Aves]))
 † Steklovia Schlickum & Strauch, 1972: synonym of † Apula C. R. Boettger, 1909 † (junior subjective synonym)

References